Issam Al-Edrissi (born 12 September 1984), commonly known as Issa Issa, is a footballer who plays as a midfielder for German club VfB Frohnhausen. Born in Lebanon, Issa moved to Germany at an early age; he represented Lebanon internationally.

Club career
Issa began his career 1992 in Germany, at Schwarz-Weiss Essen's youth side, before joining local rivals FC Schalke 04 in 1994. Six years later, he was scouted by Rot-Weiss Essen. Issa played in the U19s, and was promoted to the first team in the winter season. 

After his first professional season for Rot-Weiss Essen, Issa joined Borussia Dortmund II for €150,000. He scored six goals in 44 appearances for Borussia Dortmund II in four years, before moving to SV Lippstadt 08 in 2006, where he scored 25 goals in 78 games. In 2008, Issa signed for Hammer SpVg, where he scored four goals in 31 matches. He was released one year later, and signed for SV Meppen after six months without a club, on 26 January 2010. After half a season, Issa signed in summer 2010 for SG Wattenscheid 09.

International career
Issa represented the Lebanon national team at international level, playing three matches in 2004.

Personal life
Issa's younger brother Khaled currently plays for Rot-Weiss Essen U17, and presented formerly the youth of NK Croatia Essen and Schwarz-Weiss Essen.

References

External links
 
 
 
 Issa Issa at FuPa 

1984 births
Living people
Footballers from Beirut
Lebanese footballers
German footballers
German people of Lebanese descent
Association football midfielders
Regionalliga players
Borussia Dortmund II players
Oberliga (football) players
SV Lippstadt 08 players
Hammer SpVg players
SV Meppen players
SG Wattenscheid 09 players
Sportfreunde Siegen players
KFC Uerdingen 05 players
1. FC Bocholt players
Lebanon international footballers